The Toombs County School District is a public school district in Toombs County, Georgia, United States, based in Lyons. It serves the communities of Lyons, Santa Claus, and Vidalia.

Schools
The Toombs County School District has three elementary schools, one middle school, and one high school.

Elementary schools
Lyons Primary School
Lyons Upper Elementary School
Toombs Central Elementary School

Middle school
Toombs County Middle School

High school
Toombs County High School

References

External links

School districts in Georgia (U.S. state)
Education in Toombs County, Georgia